San Michele is the Italian name of Saint Michael. It may also refer to:

Places
Italy
 San Michele all'Adige, a municipality of the Province of Trento, Trentino-Südtirol
 San Michele al Tagliamento, a municipality of the Province of Venice, Veneto
 San Michele di Ganzaria, a municipality of the Province of Catania, Sicily
 San Michele di Serino, a municipality of the Province of Avellino, Campania
 San Michele Mondovì, a municipality of the Province of Cuneo, Piedmont
 San Michele Salentino, a municipality of the Province of Brindisi, Apulia
 San Michele Tiorre, a hamlet of Felino (PR), Emilia-Romagna
 Dusino San Michele, a municipality of the Province of Asti, Piedmont
 Olivetta San Michele, a municipality of the Province of Imperia, Liguria

Churches
Italy
 San Michele Arcangelo - in Anacapri
 San Michele Arcangelo, Antegnate - in province of Bergamo
 San Michele e San Francesco, Carmignano
 San Michele, Cremona 
 San Michele Visdomini - in Florence
 San Michele in Foro - in Lucca
 Church of San Michele - in Maddaloni
 San Michele Abbey, Monticchio - Abbey in Basilicata
 San Michele di Pavia - in Pavia (also known as San Michele Maggiore)
 San Michele in Borgo - in Pisa
 San Michele Arcangelo, Trecesali - in province of Parma 
 San Michele in Isola - in Venice
 San Michele Arcangelo, Verghereto - in province of Forli-Cesena
 San Michele Extra - in Verona

Other
 Isola di San Michele, island cemetery of Venice
 Villa San Michele, on the island of Capri